D. Ray James Correctional Institution is a private prison located in Folkston, Charlton County, Georgia, owned and operated by the GEO Group under contract with the Federal Bureau of Prisons and the U.S. Marshals Service.

The facility first opened in 1998 for Georgia state inmates.  In 2010, after an expansion, the 1800 existing Georgia inmates were moved to other state prisons, replaced with as many as 2507 federal immigration detainees.

In August 2016, Justice Department officials announced that the FBOP would be phasing out its use of contracted facilities, on the grounds that private prisons provided less safe and less effective services with no substantial cost savings.  The agency expects to allow current contracts on its thirteen remaining private facilities to expire.  D. Ray James is one of those facilities.

Canadian activist Marc Emery was held at D. Ray James in 2010/2011 as a "deportable alien".

References

External links 

 Marc Emery blog entry on conditions at D. Ray James

Prisons in Georgia (U.S. state)
Buildings and structures in Charlton County, Georgia
GEO Group
1998 establishments in Georgia (U.S. state)